Bandar Gavater (also Romanized as Shahrak Maskūnī-ye Gavāter; also known as Gavātar, Gavāter, Govātar, Gvātar, and Gwātar) is a village in Sand-e Mir Suiyan Rural District, Dashtiari District, Dashtiari County, Sistan and Baluchestan Province, Iran. At the 2006 census, its population was 437, in 85 families.  The village is located on Gwadar Bay, near the border with Pakistan.

Historical features 
Gwatar was a Portuguese military base before it became a village.  The old village of Gwatar was a trading base before it was devastated in a war between its Sardarzahi rulers, Sardar Jalalkhan and Sardar Mirsuban.  After the war all of its population migrated to Jiwani in Pakistan.

References

See also

 Sutkagan Dor

Populated places in Chabahar County
Iran–Pakistan border